Fredrik Robert Martin (1868-1933) was a Swedish diplomat, scholar, collector, art historian, and author. He worked as a dragoman (interpreter) at the Swedish diplomatic mission in Constantinople.

Being a dedicated collector, Martin documented his journeys in a number of acclaimed books, specifically the miniature painting and painters of Persia, India and Turkey, from the 8th to the 18th century.

Works 
 Moderne Keramik von Centralasien (1897) 
 Morgenländische Stoffe (1897)
 Dänische Silberschätze aus der Zeit Christians IV aufbewahrt in der Kaiserlichen Schatzkammer zu Moskau (1900) 
 Die persischen Prachtstoffe im Schlosse Rosenborg in Kopenhagen (1901)
 A history of oriental carpets before 1800 (1908)
 Sett, hört och känt : skisser från Turkiet, Ryssland, Italien och andra land (1933)

References 

1868 births
1933 deaths
Swedish art historians
Swedish orientalists